Soundstage is an American live concert television series produced by WTTW Chicago and HD Ready. The original series aired for 13 seasons between 1974 and 1985; a new series of seasons began in 2003, with the latest (Season 11) starting in April 2018, each presented in high-definition with surround sound. Some performances have been made available on DVD. The performances are taped on stage at the WTTW television studio in Chicago, as well as large venues throughout the United States.

Airing nationally on PBS, MTV Live, CMT, Rave HD, and GAC, as well as internationally in over 20 countries, the program features intimate performances by well-established as well as up-and-coming artists.

Initial series
The series originated in 1972 as Made in Chicago, and was taped and broadcast by WTTW. It presented a dramatic contrast to the way music had been televised until that point; variety shows (such as The Ed Sullivan Show) and lip-synched cabaret shows (such as The Andy Williams Show) were the norm. Made in Chicago (originated by Ken Ehrlich, who had previously produced The Marty Faye Show) foregrounded the music and emphasized live performance and, at times, improvisation.

In 1974, the show's name was changed to Soundstage, and it became more widely distributed by PBS. Artists who appeared in the early years of the show included figures from rock (Bob Dylan, Tom Waits), pop (the Bee Gees), blues (Bonnie Raitt and Muddy Waters), jazz (Professor Longhair, Dizzy Gillespie, and Benny Goodman, as well as specials dedicated to the Down Beat Readers Poll Award winners), folk (Jim Croce, Janis Ian, Arlo Guthrie, and Harry Chapin), and gospel/soul/R&B (Al Green and Aretha Franklin). The 1980 appearance by John Prine is "the only archival concert of Prine available on DVD". One of the most unusual episodes, broadcast in 1983, was devoted to Andy Kaufman, who hosted it in a (somewhat bizarre) variety show format; it was his last major television appearance.

Artists

Original series

Season 1: 1974
 "Blues Summit in Chicago" with Muddy Waters, Willie Dixon, Koko Taylor, Junior Wells, Pinetop Perkins, Mike Bloomfield, Buddy Miles, Johnny Winter, Dr. John, and Nick Gravenites. Band members: Rollow Radford, Robert Margolin, Willie "Big Eyes" Smith, Calvin "Fuzz" Jones, Luther "Snake Boy" Johnson, Jerry Portnoy. July 1974
 José Feliciano, 1974
 Randy Newman, 1974
 "The Book of Chapin" with Harry Chapin, 1974
 "Arlo's Gang" with Arlo Guthrie, Steve Goodman and Hoyt Axton with David P. Jackson Jr. and John Pilla.  This episode is sometimes referred to as "Arlo and Friends"  Nov. 11 1974 
 "Yes, We Can Can" with The Pointer Sisters, Dec. 1974
 "Bonnie Raitt & Friends" w/ Buddy Guy and Junior Wells. Dec 14 1974
 "New Jazz" with Return To Forever featuring Chick Corea; Herbie Hancock with The Headhunters; Chick Corea & Herbie Hancock in duet, 1974
 "New Orleans Swamp" with Professor Longhair, Earl King, The Meters, and Dr. John and the Night Trippers, 1974
 "Paradise Club of '58" with Jackie Wilson, Della Reese, George Kirby, and Red Saunders Orchestra, 1974
 John Sebastian, David Bromberg, 1974
 Tom Rush, Tom T. Hall, 1974
 Seals and Crofts with England Dan & John Ford Coley and Walter Heath
 Donovan, Dave Mason, 1974
 Don McLean, The Persuasions, 1974
 Kris Kristofferson, Rita Coolidge, Larry Gatlin, Bill Swan, 1974

Season 2: 1975/1976
 "The World of John Hammond, Part One" with hosts Goddard Lieberson, Jerry Wexler, performers Marion Williams, Jessy Nixon, Milt Hinton, Bennie Carter, Benny Morton, Red Norvo, George Benson, Teddy Wilson, Jo Jones, Helen Humes, Benny Goodman, Dec. 13
 "The World of John Hammond, Part Two" with hosts Goddard Lieberson, Jerry Wexler, performers Benny Goodman, George Benson, Teddy Wilson, Milt Hinton, Leonard Feather, Sonny Terry, Mitch Miller, John P. Hammond, Bob Dylan, Dec. 14
 Barry Manilow, 1975
 Blood, Sweat & Tears, Janis Ian, 1975
 Tom Waits, Mose Allison Dec. 22
 Three Dog Night
 Waylon Jennings, Jessie Colter, Johnny Rodriguez, 1975
 Bee Gees, Yvonne Elliman, 1975
 "Sixty Minutes to Kill" with Martin Mull and His Fabulous Furniture and Flo & Eddie
 Phil Everly and Dion DiMucci aka "Dion"
 Anne Murray, Dobie Gray, 1975
 "Downbeat Jazz Awards" with Chick Corea, Quincy Jones, George Benson, Stanley Clarke, Freddie Hubbard, Hubert Laws, Bill Watrous, Lenny White, Airto Moreira, Roland Kirk, Sonny Rollins, McCoy Tyner, 1975
 Stan Kenton, The Four Freshmen, Anita O'Day, 1976
 Judy Collins, Leonard Cohen, 1976
 Asleep at the Wheel, Leon Redbone, 1976

Season 3: 1976/1977
 Jean-Luc Ponty, Doug Kershaw, and Itzhak Perlman - "Fiddlers Three", 1976
 "Sing Me a Jazz Song" with Jon Hendricks, Annie Ross, Leon Thomas, Eddie Jefferson, 1976
 "Woodie Guthrie's America" with host Studs Terkel, performers Arlo Guthrie, Pete Seeger, Judy Collins, Fred Hellerman, 1976
 The Spinners, 1976
 "Dizzy Gillespie's Bebop Reunion" with Dizzy Gillespie, Al Haig, James Moody, Milt Jackson, Kenny Clarke, Ray Brown, Sarah Vaughan, Joseph Carroll, 1976
 "Downbeat Jazz Awards" with George Benson, Gary Burton, Ron Carter, Stanley Clarke, Billy Cobham, Jean-Luc Ponty, Bill Watrous, Sonny Fortune, Thad Jones, Chick Corea, 1976
 Loudon Wainwright III, 1977
 "An Evening with Jackson Browne", 1977
 B.B. King and Bobby Blue Bland, 1977
 The Charlie Daniels Band, with special guest Leo Kottke, 1977
 "A Santana Festival" with Carlos Santana, Gato Barbieri, Tower of Power, 1977

Season 4: 1977/1978
 Kenny Loggins, Jesse Winchester, Michael Murphey, Live at Red Rocks, 1977
 Burton Cummings and Randy Bachman, 1977
 Hank Williams Jr., Vassar Clements, Katy Moffatt, 1977
 Phoebe Snow, David Bromberg, 1977
 Graham Parker and The Rumour, Rick Danko, 1977
 The Doobie Brothers
 "Dave Brubeck and Sons", Darius Brubeck, Chris Brubeck, Dan Brubeck, The Murray Louis Dance Company, 1977
 "David Amram and Friends", Dizzy Gillespie, Steve Goodman, Jethro Burns, Bonnie Koloc, Chicago Symphony Orchestra, 1978
 Al Green, 1978
 The Crusaders, Roy Ayers, Ubiquity Starbooty, 1978
 Peter Allen, Patti LaBelle, 1978
 "The World of Proctor and Bergman, Philip Proctor, Peter Bergman, Hirth Martinez, 1978

Season 5: 1978/1979
 Leo Sayer, 1978
 Emmylou Harris, Buck White, The Hot Band, The Whites 1978
 Journey, with Albert King, Luther Allison, Pinetop Perkins, Jerry Portnoy, 7/9/1978
 Pablo Cruise, 1978
 Ry Cooder, with The Golden Gate Quartet, 1978
 "Fifth Anniversary Show" with host Harry Chapin, 1978
 "George Benson, Chet Atkins and Earl Klugh" 1978
 Garland Jeffreys, Carmen McRae, Sonny Rollins, 1979
 "Shel Silverstein and Dr. Hook"
 Freddy Fender, Doug Sahm, Huey Meaux, LeBlanc and Carr, 1979
 Bruce Roberts, with guests Alice Cooper, Bernie Taupin, 1979
 Eddie Rabbit, Bobby Bare, 1979

Season 6: 1979/1980
 Gordon Lightfoot 1979
 The Temptations, 1979
 The Doobie Brothers, 1979
 "Chick Corea and Al Jarreau", with Gary Burton, Gayle Moran, Bunny Brunel, Tom Brechtlein, 1979
 Ella Fitzgerald, with Count Basie, Joe Pass, Roy Eldridge, Zoot Sims, Paul Smith, Keter Betts, Mickey Roker, 1979
 Elvin Bishop, with Mighty Joe Young, Son Seals, 1979
 Joan Armatrading 1979
 "Sixth Anniversary Show", 1979
 John Prine, 1980
 Rupert Holmes, 1980
 Southside Johnny and The Asbury Jukes, with Junior Wells, 1980
 "Tom Johnston (Doobie Brother)" 1978, 1980
 Johnny Paycheck, Mickey Gilley, 1980

Season 7: 1980/1981
 "An Evening with Dionne Warwick", 1980
 Victor Borge - "Comedy in Music", 1980
 The Manhattan Transfer, 1980
 Little River Band, 1980
 Don Williams, 1981
 Lacy J. Dalton and Con Hunley, 1981
 "Just Folk" with Odetta, Tom Paxton, Bob Gibson, Josh White Jr., 1981
 "An Evening with Roberta Flack" with guest Dwight Watkins, 1981
 The Oak Ridge Boys, 1981

Season 8: 1981/1982
 Chicago Jazz Festival, with Herbie Hancock, Carmen McRae, Sun Ra and His Arkestra, 1981
 Doc Severinsen and Xebron, with Gus Giordano Jazz Dance Chicago, 1981
 Cheap Trick at ChicagoFest, 1981
 Roger Miller, 1982
 The Blasters, with Carl Perkins, Willie Dixon, 1982
 Ronnie Milsap, 1982
 "Full Swing" with Charlotte Crosley, Lorraine Feather, Steve March, 1982
 The Marshall Tucker Band, Micheal Smotherman, 1982
 "Doo Wop!" with The Capris, The Harptones, The Jive Five, The Mystics, Randy & The Rainbows, 1982
 Etta James, with Dr. John, Allen Toussaint, 1982

Season 9: 1983
 Loverboy, 1983
 The Roches, 1983
 Tina Turner, 1983
 Joe Cocker, 1983
 V.S.O.P., with Herbie Hancock, Wynton Marsalis, Branford Marsalis, 1983
 Peabo Bryson and Angela Bofill, 1983
 Marshall Crenshaw, 1983
 "The Andy Kaufman Show", 1983
 "The Chicago Bluegrass Festival" with John McEuen, Jimmy Ibbotson, Doc Watson, Merle Watson, Peter Rowan, David Bromberg, 1983
 Greg Kihn, 1983

Season 10: 1985
 Chicago Jazz Festival with The Buddy Rich Big Band, Bud Freeman Sextet, Doc Cheatham, A Tribute to Count Basie, with Clark Terry, Buddy DeFranco, Gus Johnson, Charlie Rouse, Nat Pierce, Milton Hinton, 1985
 Chicago Jazz Festival, A Tribute to Charlie Parker, with Lou Donaldson, James Moody, Ira Sullivan, Duke Jordan, Mongo Santamaria, 1985
 Aretha Franklin, 1985
 "Tenth Anniversary Special" with host Dionne Warwick, 1985

New series

Season 1: 2003
 Lyle Lovett, Randy Newman, and Mark Isham, March 2003
 Chicago, live in concert, June 2003
 Michael McDonald, July 2003
 Alison Krauss and Union Station, July 2003
 Tom Petty and the Heartbreakers, July 2003
 Lucinda Williams and Kasey Chambers, July 2003
 Chris Isaak and Raul Malo, August 2003
 Trace Adkins and Travis Tritt, August 2003
 Tori Amos, August 2003 Taped May 2, 2003
 Wilco and Sonic Youth, September 2003
 John Hiatt and the Goners, Dar Williams, Robinella and the CCString Band, September 2003
 Peter Cetera and Amy Grant, October 2003
 Farm Aid 2003 at Germain Amphitheater, Columbus, Ohio, featuring Willie Nelson, Neil Young and Crazy Horse, John Mellencamp, Dave Matthews, Sheryl Crow, Brooks & Dunn, Emmylou Harris, Los Lonely Boys, Hootie & the Blowfish, Billy Bob Thornton and Trick Pony, November 2003

Season 2: 2004
 Fleetwood Mac at the FleetCenter in West End Boston, June 2004 taped September 24, 2003
 Sheryl Crow, June 2004
 Ronald Isley and Burt Bacharach, July 2004
 Alanis Morissette, July 2004
 Lisa Marie Presley and Peter Wolf, July 2004
 Cyndi Lauper, August 2004
 Joan Baez, Gillian Welch, and Nickel Creek, August 2004
 Counting Crows and Shelby Lynne, August 2004
 Dan Fogelberg, September 2004
 Steve Winwood, September 2004
 30 Odd Foot of Grunts and Kris Kristofferson, September 2004
 Yes at Tsongas Arena, Lowell, Massachusetts, Taped May 15, 2004. Premiered September 2004
 Chris Isaak Christmas album Special, with guests Michael Bublé, Brian McKnight and Stevie Nicks, Taped September 23–24, 2004 Premiered December 2, 2004

Season 3: 2005
 Michael McDonald with guests Billy Preston, Toni Braxton, Take 6 and India.Arie in Tennessee, June 2005
 John Mayer with Buddy Guy, July 2005
 The Wallflowers, July 2005
 Heart, July 2005
 America with guest Christopher Cross, August 2005
 Ringo Starr & the Roundheads with guest Colin Hay at Genesee Theatre, Waukegan, Illinois, August 2005
 Lindsey Buckingham with Stevie Nicks, September 2005
 Chris Isaak, September 2005
 Trisha Yearwood with guests Billy Currington and Sugarland, September 2005
 Joss Stone with guest Mavis Staples, October 2005
 Martina McBride at Genesee Theatre, Waukegan, Illinois, October 2005
 Dave Matthews Band with guests Robert Randolph, Rashawn Ross and David Cast at Red Rocks Amphitheatre, November 2005

Season 4: 2006–2007
 Robert Plant and the Strange Sensation, June 2006
 Garbage, July 2006
 Bill Laswell, AXIOM SOUND SYSTEM, and Musical Freezone featuring Tabla Beat Science, Pharoah Sanders backed by Material, and two Praxis members Buckethead and Bootsy Collins, July 2006
 The All American Rejects and Fountains of Wayne, July 2006
 KT Tunstall, July 2006
 Train, August 
 Tom Petty Live from Gainesville 30th Anniversary Concert, November 2006
 Peter Frampton, January 2007
 New York Dolls, February 2007
 Lee Ann Womack with Julie Roberts, February 2007
 Jewel at Meyerson Symphony Center, Dallas, February 2007
 Rickie Lee Jones, February 2007
 Mark Knopfler and Emmylou Harris at Gibson Amphitheatre, Los Angeles, March 2007

Season 5: 2007
 Rob Thomas, January 2007
 NY Dolls, February 2007
 Rickie Lee Jones, February 2007
 Mark Knoffler & EmmyLou Harris, February 2007
 Rob Thomas at Red Rocks Amphitheatre, June 2007
 Macy Gray, July 2007
 Dashboard Confessional at Madison Square Garden, July 2007
 Jewel at Rialto Square Theatre, Joliet, Illinois, July 2007 Taped November 28, 2006
George Jones 50 Years Special, with guests Alan Jackson, Kenny Chesney, Wynonna, Martina McBride, Aaron Neville, Harry Connick Jr., Randy Travis, Lorrie Morgan, Vince Gill, Trick Pony, Amy Grant, Sammy Kershaw, Trace Adkins, Uncle Kracker, Connie Smith, Emmylou Harris, Joe Diffie, Kris Kristofferson, Shelby Lynne and Tanya Tucker, November 2007

Season 6: 2008
 Tom Petty and the Heartbreakers, January 2008
 Lifehouse, January 2008
 Daughtry, January 2008
 John Fogerty, February 2008
 Josh Groban at EnergySolutions Arena, Salt Lake City, June 2008 taped August 28, 2007
 REO Speedwagon, July 2008
 Bon Jovi, July 2008
 Stevie Nicks, July 2008
 Matchbox Twenty, July 2008
 Kenny Chesney, August 2008
 Faith Hill, Joy to the World, A Soundstage Special Event at Sears Centre Arena, November 2008 Taped September 10, 2008

Season 7: 2009
 Counting Crows, Saturday Nights & Sunday Mornings, January 2009
 Idina Menzel with special guests Josh Groban and Ravi Coltrane at Rose Hall at Jazz at Lincoln Center, New York, January 2009
 Foreigner, January 2009
 B.B. King with special guests Terrence Howard, Richie Sambora, and Solange Knowles, January 2009
 Umphrey's McGee, February 2009
 Seal, February 2009
 Jackson Browne, June 2009
 OneRepublic, June 2009
 Sugarland, July 2009
 Death Cab for Cutie, July 2009
 Billy Idol at the Congress Theater, July 2009
 Fall Out Boy, July 2009
 Josh Groban: An Evening in New York City, July 2009
 Michael McDonald: This Christmas

Season 8: 2010
 Tim McGraw, January 2010
 The Fray, January 2010
 3 Girls and Their Buddy featuring Emmylou Harris, Patty Griffin, Shawn Colvin and Buddy Miller, January 2010 Taped October 29, 2009
 Lynyrd Skynyrd, January 2010
 Willie Nelson, January 2010

Season 9: 2016
 Toby Keith, April 2016
 GeorgeFest, celebrating the music of George Harrison featuring performances by Brian Wilson, Norah Jones, Dhani Harrison, Ann Wilson of Heart, and more. May 2016
 Jason Isbell, May 2016
 Jake Owen, May 2016
 Regina Spektor, October 2016

Season 10: 2017
 Bad Company, January 2017
 Jon Secada, January 2017
 Blondie, January 2017
 Old Dominion, February 2017
 Tom Jones, March 2017

Season 11: 2018
 Chicago, April 2018
 Katharine McPhee, April 2018
 The Manhattan Transfer/Take 6, April 2018
 Michael McDonald, April 2018
 RSO (Richie Sambora and Orianthi), May 2018

References

External links
  (1974)
  (2003)
 WTTW National Productions

American television series revived after cancellation
PBS original programming
Television series by WTTW
1970s American music television series
1980s American music television series
2000s American music television series
2010s American music television series
1974 American television series debuts
1985 American television series endings
2003 American television series debuts
2010 American television series endings
2016 American television series debuts
2018 American television series endings